WIST-FM is a Regional Mexican outlet serving the Piedmont Triad region of North Carolina. The GHB Broadcasting station is licensed to Thomasville, North Carolina.  The studios and transmitter are co-located in High Point, North Carolina.

History
The station started in Thomasville, North Carolina as WTNC-FM. During its history, its call letters have included WEYE. At one point, the station played country music during the day and urban contemporary music at night. During the 80s, 98.3, with the call sign WTHP, was one of the first oldies stations in the area.

Buddy Poole, one of several partners who bought the station along with WTNC in 1984, was general manager from 1984 until 2002, when he bought WSAT in Salisbury.

On May 5, 1989, the station lost its tower when severe storms struck the area.

In the mid-90s, under the calls WFAZ, 98.3 played contemporary Christian music. After the station's sale to GHB Broadcasting, a switch was made in 1997 to adult standards, mostly from the Satellite Music Networks format Stardust. The call letters WIST-FM were chosen at this time.

During most of 2004, the former WTNC was WIST-AM, airing most of the FM station's programming. In 2005, WIST-AM became sports talk WBLO "790 The Ball". WAAA (now WTOB) in Winston-Salem began airing the station's programming at that time, but that station was not able to broadcast at full power and later changed to sports talk.

The FM station changed to classic country as "Country Legends 98.3" in October 2005.

On June 4, 2010, Norberto Sanchez of Norsan Multimedia said that his company would lease WIST-FM and WBLO, with an option to buy.  WIST-FM would have a Spanish language format, including broadcasts of the NFL Carolina Panthers Radio, serving the Triad area. The change on the FM station took place at 6 P.M. June 30, after George Jones' "Who's Gonna Fill Their Shoes" played.

References

External links

IST-FM